Tony Mitchell may refer to:

Tony Mitchell (basketball, born 1989), basketball player formerly of the University of Alabama
Tony Mitchell (basketball, born 1992), 2013 NBA Draft selection out of the University of North Texas
Tony Mitchell (director), Canadian-British film and TV director
Tony Mitchell (musician) (born 1951), Australian musician
Tony Mitchell (footballer) (born 1956), English footballer

See also
Anthony Mitchell (disambiguation)
Tony Michell (born 1947), British businessman